Aloysius Masnata, (S.J.) (May 2, 1823 – November 18, 1886) was the 5th president of Santa Clara University, California, United States. He was a Genoese priest. At the age of seventeen he was admitted into the novitiate  of the Society of Jesus. After studying philosophy and rhetoric and teaching for a year, he was sent to Vals, France, for the study of theology. After his study in France, he immigrated to the United States with other Jesuits after ordination and completed his fourth year of theology at Georgetown College along with Rev. Salvator Canio and Rev. Joseph Bixio. After his study he spent four years teaching rhetoric at Frederick, Maryland, where he was minister and socius to the master of novices. In 1854 Masnata S.J. sailed to California through Panama and arrived in San Francisco, United States, along with Fr. Charles Messea S.J. and Fr. Anthony Maraschi S.J. In 1865 he was appointed Santa Clara University's fifth president successor of the presidency of Burchard Villiger. In 1868, shy and lacking in proper English, Masnata was replaced by Aloysius Varsi. In 1873 Fr. Aloysius Masnata, S.J. served as the 6th president of San Francisco's St. Ignatius College. On November 18, 1886, Aloysius Masnata died in Los Gatos, California.

References

External sources
 
 
 
 

1823 births
1886 deaths
19th-century American Jesuits
19th-century Italian Jesuits
Georgetown University alumni
Santa Clara University faculty
Santa Clara University people
Presidents of Santa Clara University
Presidents of the University of San Francisco
Italian emigrants to the United States